Johannes Richter (born 6 December 1993) is a German professional basketball player who last played for Mitteldeutscher BC of the Basketball Bundesliga.

Professional career
On 6 June 2016, Richter signed a two-year deal with Telekom Baskets Bonn.

Richter signed with BBL newcomers Oettinger Rockets for the 2017–18 season.

On 14 August 2020 he signed with Gießen 46ers of the Basketball Bundesliga.

On 8 January 2021 he signed with Hamburg Towers of the Basketball Bundesliga.

On 11 June 2021 he signed with Mitteldeutscher BC of the Basketball Bundesliga.

References

1993 births
Living people
Baunach Young Pikes players
Brose Bamberg players
German men's basketball players
Hamburg Towers players
Mitteldeutscher BC players
Power forwards (basketball)
Rockets (basketball club) players
S.Oliver Würzburg players
Skyliners Frankfurt players
Telekom Baskets Bonn players